KGLI (95.5 FM; "KG95") is a radio station broadcasting an adult contemporary format. The station serves Sioux City, Iowa, United States, and is owned by iHeartMedia (formerly Clear Channel Communications).

History
The station signed on the air in 1974 as KBCM. In 1983 the station became KGLI with a Top 40 (CHR) format as "KG95". Some of the original live air talent from the 80's; Mark Hahn mornings, Paul Fredricks, Duke Williams, Paul Davis, Donnie Roberts middays, Rick Elliott, Doug Collins, Rick Allen afternoons, Matt Thombstone, Glenn Miller nights. The station remained a Top 40 station until tweaking to hot adult contemporary on March 13, 2006, when co-owned adult contemporary KSFT-FM switched to Top 40 as "107.1 Kiss FM". By 2009, KGLI shifted to an Adult Contemporary format. KG95 has been a consistent leader in their core demo of woman 25-54 during their 25-year presence in Sioux City.  In February 2010, KG95 began carrying Delilah's love songs program at night.

Management
General Manager: Mike Hogan
Operations Manager: Rob Powers
Program Director: Rob Powers

Previous logos

External links
KG95 KGLI official website

Mainstream adult contemporary radio stations in the United States
GLI
Radio stations established in 1974
IHeartMedia radio stations